Stone Ridge is a census-designated place in Loudoun County, Virginia, United States. Residences use Aldie mailing addresses, and it is near Washington Dulles International Airport. The population as of the 2020 census was 15,039. As of the 2020 census, the population had increased to 15,039. Stone Ridge is a Van Metre Homes planned, mixed-use community.

Transportation 
Stone Ridge is less than a mile south of U.S. Route 50, which connects the town to Lenah and Chantilly. Stone Ridge is crossed by five other major roads: Virginia State Route 2200 (Tall Cedars Parkway) and Virginia State Route 2625 (Stone Springs Boulevard) in the center, Virginia State Route 616 (Goshen Road), which forms the town's western border, Virginia State Route 659 (Gum Spring Road), which roughly forms the town's eastern border, and Northstar Boulevard; a major collector road, which is sightly west. U.S. 50 and SR 2200 roughly forms the northern border of Stone Ridge.

Stone Ridge is served by both the Village Center and Stone Springs Hospital bus stations, which serves and is the western terminus of the 88 route. The 88 route connects the town to settlements further east along U.S. Route 50, including South Riding. The eastern terminus of 88X bus route is the Wiehle-Reston East Metro Station.

Geography 
Stone Ridge is in southeastern Loudoun County, on the south side of U.S. Route 50 (John Mosby Highway) and to the west of State Route 659 (Gum Spring Road). Stone Ridge is bordered to the north by Arcola and to the east by South Riding.

The south side of Stone Ridge drains south via Foley Branch toward Bull Run, which flows southeast past the national battlefield to the Occoquan River. The north side of the community drains to Broad Run. The Occoquan River (southeast-flowing) and Broad Run (north-flowing) each run to the Potomac River.

Schools and libraries
Gum Spring Library (opened February 23, 2013)
John Champe High School
Mercer Middle School
Arcola Elementary School
Pinebrook Elementary School
Goshen Post Elementary School

Demographics 
At the 2020 census, Stone Ridge had a population of 15,039. The racial makeup of Stone Ridge was 5,947 (39.54%) White, 1,658 (11.02%) African American, 47 (0.31%) Native American, 5,363 (35.66%) Asian, 4 (0.03%) Pacific Islander, 414 (2.75%) from other races, and 1,606 (10.68%) from two or more races. Hispanic or Latino of any race were 1,354 persons (9.00%).
In 2020, Stone Ridge had a median household income of $153,628. Loudoun County, where it is located, has the highest median household income of any county in the United States.

References

External links 
Stone Ridge homeowners' association

Census-designated places in Loudoun County, Virginia
Census-designated places in Virginia
Washington metropolitan area